Herman Sotaaen (August 27, 1888 – August 27, 1967) was a Norwegian track and field athlete who competed in the 1912 Summer Olympics. In 1912 he was eliminated in the first round of the 100 metres competition as well as of the 200 metres event.

References

External links
list of Norwegian athletes

1888 births
1967 deaths
Norwegian male sprinters
Olympic athletes of Norway
Athletes (track and field) at the 1912 Summer Olympics